William Halford was a sailor.

William Halford may also refer to:

Sir William Halford, 4th Baronet (died 1695) who was succeeded by his next brother, of the Halford baronets
Sir William Halford, 6th Baronet (1709–1768), of the Halford baronets
Sir William Halford, 3rd Baronet (c. 1693-25 March 1720), of the Halford baronets